Omiostola splendissima is a species of moth of the family Tortricidae. It is found in Carchi Province, Ecuador.

The wingspan is about 20 mm. The forewings are white, partly suffused with orange and brownish grey and glossy white along the edges of the dark brown markings. There are some silver white strigulae (fine streaks) in the terminal area and orange lines from the base to the end of the median cell, as well as in the basal third of the dorsum. The hindwings are pale brownish, but whitish towards the base.

Etymology
The species name refers to the colouration of the species and is derived from Latin splendissimus (meaning the most splendid).

References

	

Moths described in 2008
Olethreutini
Taxa named by Józef Razowski